Twigs Boutique is an independent women's fashion boutique located in Madison, Wisconsin at the Hilldale Shopping Center. Founder Jen Van Wart established the boutique in 2002 after relocating to Wisconsin from New York.

Elle Magazine recently recognized Twigs as one of the best boutiques in America.

Brands 
Twigs represents fashion designers in apparel, handbags, and jewelry. Designers include Tory Burch, Rag & Bone, Citizens of Humanity, Marc Jacobs, Tibi, Chan Luu, Canada Goose, and many more.

References

External links 
 

Companies based in Madison, Wisconsin
Clothing retailers of the United States